is a railway station in Uonuma, Niigata, Japan, operated by East Japan Railway Company (JR East).

Lines

Station layout
The station consists of one ground-level island platform  serving two tracks connected by a level crossing. The station is unattended.

History 
Along with the rest of the Tadami Line, the station came under the ownership of the Japanese National Railways (JNR) in 1949, and was absorbed into the JR East network upon the privatization of the JNR on April 1, 1987.

Surrounding area
Ōshirakawa Post Office
Japan National Route 252

See also
 List of railway stations in Japan

References

External links
  Ōshirakawa Station (JR East)

Railway stations in Niigata Prefecture
Stations of East Japan Railway Company
Railway stations in Japan opened in 1942
Tadami Line